GMA Pinoy TV is a Philippine pay television channel that was launched in March 2005, by GMA Network. Operated by its subsidiaries, GMA International and GMA Worldwide Inc, it is targeted towards the Philippine diaspora.

Programming

The programming of GMA Pinoy TV consists mostly of shows from the Philippines from GMA Network as well as previously aired shows, documentaries, films, and sports events from the Philippines. Most weekend shows are up to date, with the exception of some shows that air on a one-episode delay basis.

History

GMA Pinoy TV was first launched in Japan in March 2005. It was later launched in several parts of the United States in the same year, such as San Francisco, Los Angeles, and the states of the East Coast. The channel was launched in San Francisco on July 23, 2005.

A second channel, GMA Life TV, was successfully launched in March 2008 and soon grew to 109,000 subscribers. GMA Pinoy TV had 225,000 subscribers as of September 2009. The percent of subscribers has gone up 34% according to GMA New Media, Inc.

In December 2010, both GMA Pinoy TV and GMA Life TV has expanded its coverage area in the US to Chicago, Illinois, New York, Washington, D.C., Maryland, Alabama and Virginia, and internationally to Canada, Italy, the United Kingdom and Europe.

In 2011, the channels were launched in Australia and Papua New Guinea.

On October 5, 2011, GMA Pinoy TV accepted two awards from the National Association for Multi-Ethnicity in Communications (NAMIC) in New York for 2011 Excellence in Multicultural Marketing Awards.

See also
 GMA Network
 GMA Life TV
GMA News TV International
 The Filipino Channel
 Kapatid TV5 Channel

References

International broadcasters
Television networks in the United States
Direct broadcast satellite services
GMA International
Filipino diaspora
Cable television in the United States
International broadcasting
Television channels and stations established in 2005
Filipino-language television stations
2005 establishments in the Philippines
GMA Network (company) channels
Television networks in the United Kingdom